"Riot in Everyone" is a 2005 single by Swedish glam metal band Crashdïet. This was the first single for the band and it appears on their 2005 debut album Rest in Sleaze. With a #33 chart position, "Riot in Everyone" is Crashdïet's highest charting single. Their second highest is their 2007 single "In the Raw" with a #35 position.

Track listing

CD Single
Riot in Everyone
Out of Line

Digital Single
Riot in Everyone
Riot in Everyone (Demo)

Personnel
Dave Lepard - vocals, guitar
Martin Sweet - Guitar
Peter London - Bass guitar
Eric Young - drums

2005 singles
Songs written by Martin Sweet
Songs written by Dave Lepard
Crashdïet songs
2004 songs